The canton of Bray-sur-Seine is a French former administrative division, located in the arrondissement of Provins, in the Seine-et-Marne département (Île-de-France région). It was disbanded following the French canton reorganisation which came into effect in March 2015. It consisted of 23 communes, which joined the canton of Provins in 2015.

Demographics

Composition 
The canton of Bray-sur-Seine was composed of 23 communes:

Baby
Balloy
Bazoches-lès-Bray
Bray-sur-Seine
Chalmaison
Everly
Fontaine-Fourches
Gouaix
Gravon
Grisy-sur-Seine
Hermé
Jaulnes
Montigny-le-Guesdier
Mousseaux-lès-Bray
Mouy-sur-Seine
Noyen-sur-Seine
Les Ormes-sur-Voulzie
Passy-sur-Seine
Saint-Sauveur-lès-Bray
La Tombe
Villenauxe-la-Petite
Villiers-sur-Seine
Villuis

See also
Cantons of the Seine-et-Marne department
Communes of the Seine-et-Marne department

References

Bray-sur-Seine
2015 disestablishments in France
States and territories disestablished in 2015